Jörg Finsinger (born October 28, 1950 in Ettlingen) is a German economist.

Affiliations 
 Corresponding Member of the Austrian Academy of Sciences.

Publications (selection) 
 Jörg Finsinger, Jürgen Simon, The Harmonisation of Product Liability Laws in Britain and Germany, An Applied Legal-Economic Analysis (London: Anglo-German Foundation 1992). 
 Jörg Borrmann, Jörg Finsinger, Markt und Regulierung (Vahlen München 1999)  
 Jörg Finsinger, Versicherungsmärkte (Campus-Verlag Frankfurt 1997)

Weblinks

References

German economists
1950 births
Living people